The 1928 Georgia Bulldogs football team represented the Georgia Bulldogs of the University of Georgia during the 1928 college football season. In the first year under head coach Harry Mehre, the Bulldogs completed the season with a 4–5 record.

Schedule

References

Georgia
Georgia Bulldogs football seasons
Georgia Bulldogs football